Norman Robert Amundsen (born September 28, 1932) is a former American football player and coach and college athletics administrator.  He played college football at the University of Wisconsin–Madison and professionally as a guard for the Green Bay Packers of the National Football League (NFL).  Amundsen served as the head football coach at Beloit College from 1962 to 1967 and Valparaiso University from 1968 to 1976.  He was also the athletic director at Valparaiso from 1975 to 1979.

Career
Amundsen was drafted by the Green Bay Packers in the sixth round of the 1955 NFL Draft and later played with the team during the 1957 NFL season. He played at the collegiate level at the University of Wisconsin–Madison.

Head coaching record

See also
 List of Green Bay Packers players

References

1932 births
Living people
American football guards
Beloit Buccaneers football coaches
Coe Kohawks football coaches
Green Bay Packers players
Valparaiso Beacons football coaches
Wisconsin Badgers football players
College wrestling coaches in the United States
High school football coaches in Illinois
Coaches of American football from Illinois
Players of American football from Chicago